Arthrobacter humicola is a Gram-positive bacterium species from the genus Arthrobacter which has been isolated from soil in Japan.

References

Further reading

External links
Type strain of Arthrobacter humicola at BacDive -  the Bacterial Diversity Metadatabase

Bacteria described in 2008
Micrococcaceae